The Gamma Phi Society was a college literary society founded in New York state prior to 1833 at the Hamilton Literary & Theological Institution (today Colgate University.) The actual founding date of the society is unknown.

Gamma Phi was one of the first student societies at Colgate. It was later joined by Pi Delta around 1834. In 1840, due to active competition for membership, faculty intervened to dissolve the societies and formed the Adelphian and Aeonian Societies.

In 1880, the Adelphian Society at Madison University (Colgate University) became a chapter of the Beta Theta Pi fraternity.

In 1887, the Aeonian Society at Madison/Colgate became a chapter of the Phi Kappa Psi fraternity.

See also
List of literary societies in the United States
List of societies at Colgate University

References

College literary societies in the United States